Charles S. Cohen (born February 8, 1952) is an American real estate developer and film distributor.

Early life and education
Cohen was raised in a Jewish family in Harrison, New York. He is the son of Gloria and Sherman Cohen and nephew to Eddie and Mortimer Cohen. In the 1950s, the Cohen brothers (Eddie, Mortimer, and Sherman Cohen) founded Cohen Brothers Realty & Construction Corporation after successfully running various other businesses prior. At the age of 16, Cohen made his first short film winning an honorable mention at the Kodak Teenage Movie Awards competition. Cohen attended New York University for a year and a half before transferring to Tufts University where he majored in English. In 1974, Cohen graduated from Tufts. In 1997 he graduated from Brooklyn Law School.

Career

Real estate
Cohen Brothers Realty Corporation is a private commercial real estate development and management firm with a portfolio of 12 million square feet of wholly owned and passively managed Class A office buildings and showrooms of over 300 companies across the United States. Signature projects include the revitalization of Manhattan's renowned Decoration & Design (D&D) Building, the Southern California's Pacific Design Center and the Design Center of the Americas (DCOTA) in South Florida, the largest design center in the United States.

Cohen's New York City properties include 623 Fifth Avenue, 622 Third Avenue, 135 East 57th Street, 750 Lexington Avenue, 3 East 54th Street, 805 Third Avenue, 3 Park Avenue, 475 Park Avenue South and the D&D Building at 979 Third Avenue.

Cohen Design Centers include the revitalization of Manhattan's renowned Decoration & Design (D&D) Building, Southern California's Pacific Design Center, Decorative Center Houston (DCH) and the Design Center of the Americas (DCOTA) in South Florida.

Hotels
Representing his first venture into the hospitality arena, Mr. Cohen has redeveloped and opened the Le Méridien Dania Beach at Fort Lauderdale Airport, a design-centric hotel located on the 40-acre DCOTA (Design Center of the Americas) campus. Following a spectacular and meticulous renovation, the luxury hotel features 245 contemporary guest rooms and suites, 20,000 square feet of state-of-the-art flexible meeting space, and a completely reimagined build of all public spaces. The hotel also features five culinary outlets, including two signature concepts from Chef Richard Sandoval—Toro Latin Kitchen, the destination restaurant, and La Biblioteca de Tequila, an exclusive tequila bar & lounge. A natural extension of the DCOTA campus, the hotel's mid-century aesthetic balances a chic French flair with the maritime spirit of the tropical South Florida locale to offer travelers an all-encompassing sanctuary for discovery.

Film

Distribution
Charles S. Cohen formed Cohen Media Group in 2008 to distribute independent and arthouse films throughout North America. Cohen Media Group is today the largest American distributor of French films in the United States, while its specialty home entertainment label, the Cohen Film Collection, releases restored and re-mastered editions of classic American and foreign films on Digital platforms, Blu-ray and DVD. Cohen Media Group has distributed over 120 feature films and shorts.  Following its success at the 2017 Academy Awards® with Best Foreign Language Film winner The Salesman, Cohen Media Group scored two nominations at the 2018 ceremony, marking CMG's 8th Oscar nomination since the company was formed in 2008. Cohen Media Group's Lebanese drama The Insult was nominated for Best Foreign Language Film, while Faces Places, from iconic French director Agnès Varda and artist JR, was nominated for Best Documentary Feature.

The company has also acquired the rights to over 800 films, including cinematic landmarks from Douglas Fairbanks, Buster Keaton and Merchant Ivory Productions, best known for Howards End and Maurice. Additionally, Cohen Media Group has several feature film and television productions in active development. Charles S. Cohen is a member of the Academy of Motion Pictures Arts and Sciences (AMPAS) and is a member of the PGA (Producers Guild of America).

Exhibition
In 2017, Charles S. Cohen spectacularly renovated and reopened one of New York City's movie houses, the historic Quad Cinema in the heart of Greenwich Village, New York City. He also in the process of redeveloping the historic Larchmont Playhouse in Westchester County into an arthouse/independent film multiplex and is in the planning stage of redeveloping an arthouse/independent film multiplex in West Palm Beach, Florida. In 2017, Cohen's acquisition of the Paris cinema La Pagode, which dates back to 1896, adds to his growing catalogue of arthouse cinemas. Mr. Cohen is currently working with the French government on the plans of the restoration of this Parisian landmark. In 2018, Charles S. Cohen purchased Landmark Theatres, the nation's largest specialized theater chain dedicated to independent cinema with 252 screens in 27 markets. On 23 December 2019, he acquired British art-house cinema chain Curzon Cinemas, including the distribution arm Curzon Artificial Eye.

Other ventures
From 1991 to 1993 Cohen was a chairman at the Federal Law Enforcement Foundation. Cohen has served on the Board of Trustees of the Museum of Contemporary Art, the Cooper Union for the Advancement of Science and Art, the Lighthouse International Theater, the Public Theater, Real Estate Board of New York, the Stella Adler Studio of Acting and the Film Society of Lincoln Center.

Fashion
Two top UK fashion labels, Savile Row tailor Richard James and luxury shoe manufacturer and retailer Harrys of London, were acquired in 2016 and 2017. Cohen has a majority stake and serves as chairman at Richard James, which recently celebrated its 25th Anniversary. Cohen, who serves as chairman, will facilitate the brands' international growth strategies, beginning with the recent Manhattan store openings on Park Avenue and East 57th Street. In 2018, Cohen acquired T Anthony, a 73-year-old luxury leather goods & luggage company renowned for servicing the globetrotting lifestyles in a luxurious but practical way.  The stylish and durable line of luggage is the choice travel companion for members of the British Royal Family, the elite of Hollywood, American Presidents and VIPs from around the Globe.

Leather goods and luggage
In 2018, Cohen acquired T Anthony, a 73-year-old luxury leather goods & luggage company.

Personal life
Cohen has been married twice. He has four children from his two marriages. He is divorced from his first wife; they have two children, a daughter and a son who works at Cohen Brothers Realty Corp. In 2004, he married his second wife, Clodagh "Clo" Margaret Jacobs, a former marketing and publicity executive for fashion designer Jimmy Choo, in a Jewish ceremony at the St. Regis Hotel in Manhattan; they also have two children. The couple divides their time between homes in Manhattan and in suburban Connecticut.

References

Living people
American real estate businesspeople
American film producers
Tufts University School of Arts and Sciences alumni
20th-century American Jews
1952 births
Brooklyn Law School alumni
21st-century American Jews